Sosnovy Bor ( means "Pine Forest") is a Russian Airborne Troops garrison in Buryatia, Russia, located about 20km east of Ulan Ude, Buryatia's capital. The compound was used for the meeting of President Dmitry Medvedev and North Korean leader Kim Jong-il in August 2011.

It appears to be the garrison of the 11th Guards Airborne Brigade of the Russian Airborne Troops.

References

Military installations of Russia